Fred Jay Seaver (14 March 1877 – 21 December 1970) was an American mycologist. He worked at the New York Botanical Garden for 40 years, initially as the Director of Laboratories (1908–1911), then as the Curator (1912–1943), and finally as Head Curator (1943–1948). He was also an editor of the journal Mycologia between 1909 and 1947. In 1928, Seaver published North American Cup-fungi (Operculates), which was expanded with a supplement in 1942 and a second volume in 1951, titled North American Cup-fungi (Inoperculates).

He was honoured in 1945 when botanist Herbert Hice Whetzel published Seaverinia, which is a genus of fungi in the family Sclerotiniaceae.

References 

American mycologists
1877 births
1970 deaths